Sir Henry Alexander Miers,  FRS (25 May 1858 – 10 December 1942) was a British mineralogist and crystallographer.

Born in Rio de Janeiro, Brazil, he was educated at Eton College and Trinity College, Oxford. He was elected a Fellow of the Royal Society in 1896.

He was Professor of Crystallography at the Victoria University of Manchester 1915–1926 and Vice-Chancellor of the University during the same years.

Selected publications
with R. Crosskey:

References

External links
 AIM25: University College London: Miers Papers at www.aim25.ac.uk
 

1858 births
1942 deaths
People educated at Eton College
Alumni of Trinity College, Oxford
Fellows of the Royal Society
British mineralogists
Wollaston Medal winners
Vice-Chancellors of the Victoria University of Manchester
Academics of the University of Manchester
Manchester Literary and Philosophical Society